Marc Anthony Richardson (born December 7, 1972) is an American novelist and artist. He won an American Book Award and a Creative Capital Award.

Life and work 
Born in Elkins Park, Pennsylvania, Richardson was raised in the West Oak Lane section of Philadelphia by his mother, Betty Jean Richardson, and his father, Malcolm Anthony Richardson. He is the youngest of their three sons. In 1991, he graduated from the Philadelphia High School for the Creative and Performing Arts (where he won awards for illustration), and went on to earn his BFA from Antioch College (where he studied with Martia Golden and was a finalist for the 1994 Hurston/Wright Award for College Writers) and his MFA from Mills College (where he studied with Micheline Aharonian Marcom and was a nominee for Best New American Voice 2010).

Prior to Mills, he worked as a direct-care counselor, a visual artist, and a nude model. He briefly studied drawing, painting, and printmaking at the Pennsylvania Academy of the Fine Arts on a partial scholarship, but returned to writing because of a lack of funding. Year of the Rat, his debut novel, won the 2015 Ronald Sukenick Innovative Fiction Prize. In 2017, it was awarded an American Book Award from the Before Columbus Foundation, founded by Ishmael Reed. On being included with other winners, Richardson wrote, “To win a writer’s award from award-winning writers is a chance to be in bed with as many human beings as humanly possible." The ceremony took place at the San Francisco Jazz Center, and was televised on C-SPAN.

Year of the Rat, a Künstlerroman, draws heavily from his personal experiences, as well as from those of his family members, past and present, delving into philosophical rants, poetry, social satire, and ribald, phantasmagoric language. Over the course of a decade, many of the incidents written in the book were freshly experienced by the author, such as his father's death and the near-death accounts of his mother and himself. Initially, one reviewer wrote that "the book is certainly unique in voice and style, but it’s also frightening, ugly, dense, and borderline offensive...it will make all but the most experimental of readers throw it across a room."

Messiahs, his second novel, fixes on an anonymous couple, an Asian-American woman and an African-American man. The man volunteered imprisonment on behalf of his wrongfully convicted nephew, yet―after over two years on death row―was “exonerated.” In this dystopian society, proxies are allowed on death row in place of their convicted kin, as acts of holy reform. The initiative is based on the Passion of Christ. Messiahs was nominated as a fiction finalist for the 2021 Big Other Book Award.

Richardson was also a recipient of a PEN America grant, a Zora Neale Hurston/Richard Wright fellowship, an Art Omi residency, a Vermont Studio Center residency, and was an Andrew W. Mellon Scholar-in-residence at Rhodes University in Grahamstown, South Africa. His work has appeared in Conjunctions, Callaloo, Black Warrior Review, Western Humanities Review, and the Anthology, Who Will Speak for America? from Temple University Press. He taught at Rutgers University, New Brunswick, and currently teaches at the University of Pennsylvania. In 2021, he received a Sachs Program Grant for Arts Innovation and a Creative Capital Award for his novel-in-progress, The Serpent Will Eat Whatever is in the Belly of the Beast. Concerning the Creative Capital Award, Richardson said: "[It] means so much, because there seems to be three types of thinkers in this world: those who think inside a cell, those who think outside the cell, and those who simply think freely. This award supports the artists who work with no limitations in mind, no allegiances―whose diverse experiences require divergent formats."

Honors and awards 
 2022 Andrew W. Mellon Scholar-in-Residence at Rhodes University
 2021 Sachs Program Grant for Arts Innovation  
2021 Creative Capital Award
2017 Before Columbus Foundation/American Book Award
 2015 Fiction Collective Two (FC2) Ronald Sukenick Innovative Fiction Prize

Publications 
 The Serpent Will Eat Whatever is in the Belly of the Beast (Deep Vellum/Dalkey Archive Press) Forthcoming
 Messiahs  (Fiction Collective Two/University of Alabama Press) 2021. ISBN 978-15736619
 Year of the Rat  (Fiction Collective Two/University of Alabama Press) 2016.

References

External links 

C-SPAN: American Book Awards 2017
Entropy Interview
WXPN (88.5 FM) University of Pennsylvania, Philadelphia 
Scriptorium Reading, Sacramento, CA 
Publishers Weekly review
Kirkus review
Cleaver Magazine review (noted in the National Book Critics Circle blog, Critical Mass)

1972 births
Living people
Artist authors
Mills College alumni
African-American novelists
American male novelists
Antioch College alumni
American Book Award winners
Philadelphia High School for the Creative and Performing Arts alumni
21st-century African-American people
20th-century African-American people
African-American male writers